Museum of Fine Arts railway station is a railway and light rail station located in Gushan District, Kaohsiung, Taiwan. It is served by Taiwan Railways and the Circular Line of the Kaohsiung rapid transit system.

Around the station
 Kaohsiung Museum of Fine Arts

References

2018 establishments in Taiwan
Railway stations opened in 2018
Railway stations in Kaohsiung
Railway stations served by Taiwan Railways Administration